The Allaru Formation, also known as the Allaru Mudstone, is a geological formation in Queensland, Australia, whose strata date back to the Early Cretaceous. Dinosaur remains are among the fossils that have been recovered from the formation.

Fossil content 
Possible indeterminate ankylosaur remains are present in Queensland. Indeterminate ornithopod remains are present in Queensland.

Fish

See also 
 List of dinosaur-bearing rock formations
 Winton Formation
 Paja Formation, contemporaneous Lagerstätte in Colombia
 Sierra Madre Formation, contemporaneous fossiliferous formation of Mexico
 Santana Group, contemporaneous Lagerstätte in northeastern Brazil
 Crato Formation
 Romualdo Formation
 South Polar region of the Cretaceous

References

Bibliography 
 
 

Geologic formations of Australia
Cretaceous System of Australia
Early Cretaceous Australia
Albian Stage
Mudstone formations
Shallow marine deposits
Fossiliferous stratigraphic units of Oceania
Paleontology in Queensland